Orthomecyna is a genus of moths of the family Crambidae. All species are endemic to Hawaii.

Species
Orthomecyna albicaudata Butler, 1883
Orthomecyna alloptila Meyrick, 1899
Orthomecyna amphilyca Meyrick, 1899
Orthomecyna aphanopis Meyrick, 1888
Orthomecyna chrysophanes Meyrick, 1899
Orthomecyna crossias Meyrick, 1899 
Orthomecyna epicausta Meyrick, 1899 
Orthomecyna exigua Butler, 1879
Orthomecyna exigua cupreipennis
Orthomecyna exigua exigua
Orthomecyna heterodryas Meyrick, 1899 
Orthomecyna mesochasma Meyrick, 1899 
Orthomecyna metalycia Meyrick, 1899 
Orthomecyna phaeophanes Meyrick, 1899 
Orthomecyna picrodes Meyrick, 1899

References
Natural History Museum Lepidoptera genus database

Crambinae
Endemic moths of Hawaii
Crambidae genera
Taxa named by Arthur Gardiner Butler